Hillsdale is the largest city and county seat of Hillsdale County in the U.S. state of Michigan.  The population was 8,036 at the 2020 census.  The city is the home of Hillsdale College, a private liberal arts college.

History

This area is located in the rolling, fertile hills of South Central Michigan, bordering Indiana and Ohio, according to the boundaries set up under United States settlement. It was long occupied by the Potowatomi, an Algonquian-speaking people who were part of a long-term alliance, called the Council of Three Fires, with the Ojibwe and Odawa (Ottawa). A Potowatomi band of about 150 people, led by the chief known as Baw Beese, had a base camp near the large lake in the area.

The first European-American settler, Jeremiah Arnold, arrived in 1834 and encountered the band. They helped the early settlers. Arnold erected a cabin and moved in with his wife Percy (Round) Arnold. With the arrival of other settlers, the pioneers erected the first schoolhouse in 1838. The city was established in 1839. In 1840, the US forced out Baw Beese and his people, as well as other Potowatomi in neighboring and more distant areas of Michigan, Indiana and Ohio, making them remove to Indian Territory in present-day Kansas.

Founded in 1844 as Central Michigan College in Spring Arbor, Hillsdale College relocated to this city in 1853 and changed its name. It was the first American college to prohibit in its charter discrimination based on race, religion or sex, and became an early force for the abolition of slavery.  It was the second college in the nation to grant four-year liberal arts degrees to women.

The city was chartered in 1869. In 1885 Hillsdale dedicated its first high school building, on what is now West Street. (It is now used as the middle school.) In the late 1800s, Hillsdale became a booming railroad town, served by both freight and passenger trains.

The railroad was used by tourists to enjoy cottages and other facilities on Baw Beese Lake, named after the Potowatomi chief. About 20 minutes from downtown, the area was developed as a lake resort by the Lake Shore and Michigan Southern Railroad. People could avoid dusty travel on unpaved roads by taking the train. At the turn of the 20th century, it began to attract tourists from a wider range of cities, such as Chicago, Toledo, Elkhart and others at what had been known as Archer's Landing. People swam in the lake and could rent two types of canoes.

After World War II, the construction of interstate highways encouraged use of automobiles, and passenger traffic declined on many lines. Railroads had to restructure and the last passenger train left Hillsdale in 1956.  Dozens of fine Victorian homes had been built during the prosperity of the 19th century, many of which are still occupied as private residences, contributing to the city's historic fabric.

The 20th century brought additional improvements. In 1908 the city opened its first public library. In 1921 it opened its first hospital and in 1934 Hillsdale Municipal Airport opened.

Attempt to ban library books
After the American Library Association released a report tracking banned and challenged books in 2021, the Hillsdale Library Board met to discuss whether they should ban books created by and/or for LGBT people. The board's president said the report was "divisive and partisan." At this point, the community began discussing book banning with proponents on both sides. However, the Library Director "advised against banning any materials and said public libraries need to maintain intellectual freedom."

That summer, a library board member proposed removing several books and puzzles from the library's children's section. Impacted books include Harry Potter, as well as all children's books that include LGBT content. The puzzles in question depicted a Pride parade, as well as the 2017 Women's March in Washington, D. C.

One challenger, who is a graduate student at Hillsdale College, has explained that the books in question promote "political activism" and suggested that all of the library's children's books "should be non-partisan, with reference to contemporary American and international political parties, and apolitical, with reference to contemporary American and international political ideologies."

Jemar Tisby, whose book would be impacted, said, "There is always room for good faith critiques of any argument a book proposes," but the book challenges weren't "intellectually serious." He further explained that the challengers "are not carefully reading books, proposing counter-arguments, backing up their assertions with evidence, and offering informed opinions about a work. Instead they simply look for trigger words, evidence of so-called 'divisive' concepts ... or just listen to the opinions of others and then cast negative judgments about books."

The proposed book banning has resulted in both the library director and children's director threatening to quit.

Geography

The St. Joseph River begins in Hillsdale, flowing from Lake Baw Beese. Several parks and a beach are located around this major body of water in the city.

Climate
This climatic region is typified by large seasonal temperature differences, with warm to hot summers and cold winters.  According to the Köppen Climate Classification system, Hillsdale has a humid continental climate, abbreviated "Dfb" on climate maps.

Demographics

2010 census
As of the census of 2010, there were 8,305 people, 2,970 households, and 1,686 families living in the city. The racial makeup of the city was 95.8% White, 0.7% African American, 0.4% Native American, 0.7% Asian, 0.3% from other races, and 2.0% from two or more races. Hispanic or Latino of any race were 2.3% of the population.

There were 2,970 households, of which 31.0% had children under the age of 18 living with them, 37.7% were married couples living together, 14.3% had a female householder with no husband present, 4.7% had a male householder with no wife present, and 43.2% were non-families. 36.4% of all households were made up of individuals, and 14.6% had someone living alone who was 65 years of age or older. The average household size was 2.35 and the average family size was 3.03.

The median age in the city was 30.2 years. 22.1% of residents were under the age of 18; 21.9% were between the ages of 18 and 24; 21.9% were from 25 to 44; 20.5% were from 45 to 64; and 13.6% were 65 years of age or older. The gender makeup of the city was 47.0% male and 53.0% female.

2000 census
As of the census of 2000, there were 8,233 people, 3,067 households, and 1,781 families living in the city. The racial makeup of the city was 96.5% White, 0.6% African American, 0.5% Native American, 0.8% Asian, <0.1% Pacific Islander, 0.5% from other races, and 1.1% from two or more races. Hispanic or Latino of any race were 1.5% of the population.

There were 3,067 households, out of which 30.2% had children under the age of 18 living with them, 41.5% were married couples living together, 12.6% had a female householder with no husband present, and 41.9% were non-families. 34.6% of all households were made up of individuals, and 13.6% had someone living alone who was 65 years of age or older.  The average household size was 2.33 and the average family size was 3.01.

In the city, the population was spread out, with 22.5% under the age of 18, 21.3% from 18 to 24, 24.7% from 25 to 44, 17.4% from 45 to 64, and 14.1% who were 65 years of age or older.  The median age was 30 years. For every 100 females, there were 87.6 males.  For every 100 females age 18 and over, there were 83.7 males.

The median income for a household in the city was $34,695, and the median income for a family was $42,649. Males had a median income of $32,573 versus $22,707 for females. The per capita income for the city was $16,062. About 5.5% of families and 10.3% of the population were below the poverty line, including 10.1% of those under age 18 and 15.7% of those age 65 or over.

Education
The Hillsdale Community School District serves the city of Hillsdale. The school district is composed of one high school, Hillsdale High School, one middle school, Davis Middle School, and two elementary schools. A private school, Hillsdale Academy, and two charter schools, Will Carleton Academy and Hillsdale Preparatory School, also serve the city of Hillsdale.

The town has a lending library, the Hillsdale Community Library.

Transportation

Major highways
 run diagonally northwest through the center of the city

Airports 
Hillsdale Municipal Airport is a public use airport located just east of the city in Adams Township.

Railroad 
Indiana Northeastern Railroad has a railway line running through Hillsdale.

Media

Radio
 WPCJ 91.1 FM
 WCSR 92.1 FM / 1340 AM
 WRFH-LP 101.7 FM

Newspapers
 Hillsdale Daily News
 Imprimis, monthly speech digest of Hillsdale College
 The Collegian, student paper for Hillsdale College

Notable people
Eugene "Jack" Armstrong, victim of murder in Iraq
Lee Bartlett, three-time Olympian
Baw Beese, Potawatomi chief
Will Carleton (1845-1912); reporter and poet; associated from 1860s 
William W. Cook, legal scholar and benefactor of the University of Michigan Law School
Charles Doolittle, Civil War general
Sile Doty, thief, robber and burglar
Dick Estell, host and producer of The Radio Reader
Andrew Fink, Michigan State Legislature elected in 2020. 
Caril Ann Fugate, the youngest female in United States history to date to have been tried for first-degree murder
Henry Churchill King, theologian, president of Oberlin College (1902–1927)
Penny Neer, collegiate and Olympic athlete
John Corbett O'Meara United States District Court judge
Jason Robards Sr., actor
Michael Sessions, youngest mayor elected
Rube Vickers (1879–1958), Major League baseball pitcher
Henry Waldron, politician
Frank "Muddy" Waters (1923–2006), Hall of Fame football coach

References

External links

 City of Hillsdale official website

 
Cities in Hillsdale County, Michigan
County seats in Michigan
Michigan State Historic Sites
Populated places established in 1869
1869 establishments in Michigan